Three Oaks railway station serves the village of Three Oaks in East Sussex, England. It is on the Marshlink Line, and train services are provided by Southern. It was originally known as Three Oaks & Guestling.

History
The latter station has been renamed four times: in 1909 it became Three Oaks Halt; later on it became Three Oaks and Guestling Halt; on 5 May 1969 Three Oaks and Guestling; finally on 12 May 1980 the present name of Three Oaks was adopted. Until December 2010, Three Oaks, Doleham and Winchelsea all had just 3 trains a day each way. But now the only station with that service pattern is Doleham, with Three Oaks and Winchelsea now having a regular service with trains alternating between stops with 1 train every 2 hours for Three Oaks and Winchelsea.

Description
The station has a single platform from which trains depart to Ashford International and Eastbourne via Hastings.  The line was singled in 1979, with all trains using the one-time westbound platform, the eastbound platform remaining in situ, albeit in a decaying state.

The platform can only accommodate a single carriage, meaning that passengers wishing to disembark must travel in the front carriage of the train.

There is a ticket issuing facility accepting card payments available here and a customer help point with on-screen customer information.

Services
Services have historically been limited at the station, although this was increased in December 2010, following a campaign the by Three Oaks and Winchelsea Action for Rail Transport (THWART) and the Marshlink Line Action Group (MLAG).

All services at Three Oaks are operated by Southern using  DMUs.

Previously, westbound trains ran as an express service to  although this was changed to a stopping service to Eastbourne in the May 2018 timetable change.

References

External links

Three Oaks & Guestling Halt at Kent Rail

Railway stations in East Sussex
DfT Category F2 stations
Former South Eastern Railway (UK) stations
Railway stations in Great Britain opened in 1907
Railway stations served by Govia Thameslink Railway
Rother District